Epeli Baleibau (born 8 June 1972) is a Fijian athlete. He competed for Fiji at the 2016 Summer Paralympics.

References

1972 births
Living people
Paralympic athletes of Fiji
Athletes (track and field) at the 2016 Summer Paralympics
I-Taukei Fijian people
Fijian high jumpers